John Adelbert Davis (August 7, 1871–March 17, 1934) was the founder of the Practical Bible Training School in Johnson City, New York, in 1900. In 2004, Practical Bible was renamed Davis College in his honor.

Early life
On Melandy Hill in Afton, New York, Davis was born to Union Civil War veteran Charles Davis and his wife, Hulda Davis. Davis was the oldest of two children, his younger brother being Alonzo F. Davis. After a few years in Afton and North Sanford, New York, Davis moved to Binghamton, New York.

Religious revelation
During his time in Binghamton, New York, Davis became a very devout Christian. In 1893, he went to the Chicago Bible Institute (now the Moody Bible Institute) where he served Mr. Moody's table. Heading back to New York after his time in Chicago, Davis stopped in Kalamazoo, Michigan, where a small set of evangelical meetings turned into a large revival meetings throughout the city.

Marriage and children
Davis married Etta Carr on June 19, 1894. Their son Gordon Carr was born June 29, 1896 followed by his brother Charles Justus in 1897.

Career as an educator

Revival meetings
Davis conducted meetings in the following years of his life all over the east coast of the United States including: Binghamton, Baltimore, Maryland, Brooklyn, and New York. He also went to England.

Bible school
In the spring of 1900, Davis wanted to start a Bible school to train young men and women to become pastors, missionaries, pastor’s wives, and many other parts of the Christian ministry. In the summer of 1900, the classes of the Practical Bible Training School began in Lestershire (now Johnson City), New York. Davis became one of the teachers and the Superintendent of the school. Davis chose a long-time friend John R. Clements to be the first president of the college. The school moved to Harrison Street soon after the first classes and in 1911 the school moved to its present location on Riverside Drive in the village of Johnson City, New York.

PBTS
In 1914, the Practical Bible Training School was prospering and Dr. Davis became the President of the School. In 1922 the student body formed the Students League of Many Nations one of the first Multicultural ministries in America. It would travel to every state in the union, and even opened the United States Congress in prayer on multiple occasions, one of these times with the President of the United States.

Later years
On November 22, 1931, John and Etta lost their son, Charles. The next year in 1932, several faculty and staff left to form Baptist Bible Seminary (now in Clark Summit, Pennsylvania).

Death
On Saturday, March 17, 1934 after a stroke and several other health problems, Davis died in his bed. Over 4,000 people attended his funeral on the Knoll behind the school.

1871 births
1934 deaths
American Christians
Moody Bible Institute alumni
People from Binghamton, New York
People from Afton, New York
People from Johnson City, New York
Educators from New York (state)